Vigra transmitter was a transmitter facility for medium wave broadcasting near Vigra in Norway. It was used until 1953 for transmission with a T-antenna. This antenna was replaced in 1952/53 by a guyed, steel-tube mast radiator insulated against the earth with a height of 243 metres. In 1999, the height of the mast was reduced for air traffic safety reasons to 232 metres.

The Vigra transmitter frequency was 630 kHz with a power of 100 kilowatts, enabling it to be received at night in much of Europe, with the daytime signal taking in Iceland, the Faroes, Shetland and Orkney Islands, Scotland and up to Andøya Island in Norway.

References

External links
https://web.archive.org/web/20060827174010/http://www.waniewski.de/id295.htm
Oversikt over Norske Kringkastere utarbeidet ved samarbeid mellom DX-Listeners' Club (DXLC) og Just N. Qvigstad (In Norwegian)

Former radio masts and towers
Transmitter sites in Norway
Giske
1934 establishments in Norway
Norkring